Eulophia bicallosa, commonly known as the green corduroy orchid, is a plant in the orchid family and is native to areas from tropical Asia to northern Australia. It is a terrestrial orchid with a single narrow leaf and between ten and twenty pale green or cream-coloured flowers with purplish markings. It grows in rainforest and woodland.

Description 
The middle lobe turns downwards and is wavy but the side lobes are upright. Flowering occurs between September and November in Australia and in June China.

Taxonomy and naming
The green corduroy orchid was first formally described in 1825 by David Don who gave it the name Bletium bicallosa and published the description in Prodromus Florae Nepalensis. In 1966, Peter Francis Hunt and Victor Summerhayes changed the name to Eulophia bicallosa. The specific epithet (bicallosa) is derived from the Latin prefix bi- meaning "two" or "double" and callosa meaning "with a hard skin", referring to two ridges on the labellum.

Distribution and habitat
Eulophia bicallosa grows in woodland and rainforests in coastal regions of Queensland and in the Kimberley region of Western Australia. It also occurs in Hainan province in China and in India, Indonesia, Malaysia, Myanmar, Nepal, Thailand and New Guinea.

References 

bicallosa
Orchids of Queensland
Orchids of China
Orchids of India
Orchids of Thailand
Orchids of Indonesia
Orchids of Malaysia
Orchids of Myanmar
Orchids of Nepal
Orchids of New Guinea
Plants described in 1825